Buwa may refer to:

People
 Dilip Buwa (1966–1991), Indian gangster
 Mirashi Buwa (1883–1966), Indian classical singer
 Omasan Buwa (born 1965), Nigerian lawyer and writer
 Vinayak Adinath Buwa (1925–2011), Indian humor writer

Places
 Buwa, Shwegu, a village in Bhamo District, Kachin State, Burma